Marion Bridge may refer to:
Marion Bridge (film)
Marion Bridge (Pennsylvania), a historic bridge at Point Marion
Marion Bridge, Nova Scotia, a rural community in Nova Scotia, Canada